Jordan O'Doherty (born 14 October 1997) is an Australian professional footballer who plays as a central midfielder for Indian Super League club East Bengal.

Club career

Adelaide United
In August 2016, O'Doherty signed a two-year senior contract with Adelaide United after playing for their youth team. He made his A-League debut against Newcastle Jets in a 1–1 draw. Three weeks later he made his starting debut against Melbourne City in a 2–1 loss. In Round 18 against Central Coast Mariners, O'Doherty scored his first goal for Adelaide United. In May 2018, O'Doherty was released by Adelaide United.

Western Sydney Wanderers
In June 2018, O'Doherty signed a three-year contract with Western Sydney Wanderers.

At the time, O'Doherty was quoted as saying: "Coming to the Wanderers is a good opportunity for me to be somewhere for three years and really try to do the best I can in the Hyundai A-League. I want to play in as many games as possible for the club and ultimately, I want to win trophies with the team."

"To be honest, I've always enjoyed watching the Wanderers members and fans more than any other in the league. They've brought a lot of excitement to the league and they're the best in the league, so I'm looking forward to playing in front of them."

O'Doherty made his A-League debut for Western Sydney Wanderers on 27 October 2018. He came on as a substitute on 60 minutes in a Sydney Derby match away at Sydney FC. O'Doherty started the next game, against Wellington Phoenix, scoring his first goal for the Wanderers on 90+2 minutes. 

O'Doherty went on to make 17 appearances (16 starts) in the 2018–19 A-League season before his season was cut short when he suffered an anterior cruciate ligament injury while playing against Perth Glory on 24 February 2019. O'Doherty was sidelined for the rest of the 2018–19 season, only returning to play for the Wanderers 362 days later, on 21 February 2020 in a game against Adelaide United. During the remainder of the 2019–20 A-League season he made ten appearances (seven starts). He scored his second goal for the Wanderers in the final match of the season, a 2–1 win over Melbourne Victory on 12 August 2020.

In May 2021, O'Doherty departed Western Sydney Wanderers.

East Bengal
In August 2022, O'Doherty moved abroad for the first time in his career and signed for Indian Super League club East Bengal on a one year deal.

He made his Indian Super League debut against Kerala Blasters coming on as a late substitute in a 3-1 away defeat.

Club statistics

Club

External links

References

Living people
Australian soccer players
Association football midfielders
Adelaide United FC players
Western Sydney Wanderers FC players
Newcastle Jets FC players
1997 births
A-League Men players
National Premier Leagues players